Mariyan Lovkov (born 27 September 1994) is a Bulgarian footballer who plays as a midfielder for Pirin Gotse Delchev.

References

External links

1994 births
Living people
Bulgarian footballers
Association football midfielders
PFC Pirin Gotse Delchev players
First Professional Football League (Bulgaria) players